{{DISPLAYTITLE:Iota1 Normae}}

Iota1 Normae (ι1 Normae) is a triple star system in the southern constellation of Norma. With a combined apparent visual magnitude of 4.69, it is faintly visible to the naked eye. Based upon an annual parallax shift of 25.39 mas as seen from Earth, this system is located about 128 light years from the Sun. At that distance, the visual magnitude of these stars is diminished by an extinction factor of 0.062 due to interstellar dust.

The inner pair orbit each other with a period of 26.8 years, a semimajor axis of 0.33 arc seconds, and an eccentricity of 0.515. They have a blended stellar classification of A7 IV, matching a white-hued A-type subgiant star. Both stars are actual A-type main sequence stars. The brighter of the pair, magnitude 5.20 component A, has a spectral class of A4 V, while its magnitude 5.76 companion, component B, is of class A6 V. The two are 1.94 and 1.65 times as massive as the Sun, respectively. The tertiary member, component C, is a magnitude 8.1 star with 0.88 times the mass of the Sun. It lies at an angular separation of 10.8 arc seconds from the other members.

References

A-type main-sequence stars
Triple star systems
Norma (constellation)
Normae, Iota1
143474
078662
5691
Durchmusterung objects